, also known by the abbreviation , is Japanese light novel series written by Shunsuke Sarai and illustrated by Tetsuhiro Nabeshima.

Plot
Dog & Scissors centers around Kazuhito Harumi, a high school boy who is obsessed with reading light novels. One day, while reading in a cafe, he is shot when he attempts to protect a random woman during a robbery. As he is determined to read his favorite author's unreleased last work, he gets a second chance and is reincarnated as a long-haired dachshund. In which he is adopted by Kirihime Natsuno, the person he tried to save, as well as the only person who can understand him in his new form. Kazuhito then discovers that she is not only his favorite novelist, but also a sadist who enjoys terrorizing him with scissors.

Characters

A high school bookworm who loves reading, his favorite author being Shinobu Akiyama. He lived away from his parents and sister so that he could be within walking distance of his favorite bookstore but was killed during a café robbery while protecting another customer. However, due to his regret at being unable to read Akiyama's latest novel and his desire to live, he was resurrected as a dachshund. Whilst in this form he goes by the name "Kuro".

A beautiful, yet sadistic scissor-wielding novelist who adopted Kazuhito from a pet store; she is one of the few people who can hear Kazuhito's thoughts. She writes novels and goes by her pen name "Shinobu Akiyama", whom Kazuhito greatly admires. She harbors feelings for Kazuhito and is easily jealous whenever he gets close to another girl. Natsuno is also self-conscious about her small bust and is known to find comical ways to enlarge them which causes anyone who makes some remark about them usually becoming a victim of her anger. She uses a pair of extremely durable scissors (known as "Hasajiro") that she's owned since childhood and is quite proficient with them, which, alongside her great physical prowess, makes her quite a tough fighter.

Madoka is Kazuhito's little sister who calls him "Kazu-nii." She likes making curry, but is a really bad cook, so much so that her food is always censored. She's known to use a high-tech knife that can transform into a dual-bladed chainsaw as well as a cannon. She is obsessed with her brother and would often ask for help with dating other boys to try and make him jealous, but to no avail. Following Kazuhito's death, Madoka went mad with grief and began to search for any scrap of evidence that her brother was still alive in some way. At first, she correctly believes that Kazuhito's trapped in a dog, but is convinced otherwise by Kirihime after a heated fight. Although she now believes that Kazuhito's dog form isn't her brother, she still calls him "Kazu-nii."

Kirihime's busty editor who works at the company which publishes her works. She is rather unstable, hyperactive and masochistic to the point of wanting to be abused by Kirihime. She may also be an otaku as she likes acting out and quoting certain anime phrases. She also one of the few people capable of understanding Harumi's thoughts.

A daughter of a famous author and an extremely apologetic and shy girl, who tends to be very insecure about herself and that she may bother others, to the point she will apologize numerous times and claiming she's better dead. She was a schoolmate of Kazuhito and the two met when he read an unfinished script of a novel she was writing, instead of ditching it as she expected, Kazuhito encouraged her to write more and that he'd be the first reader of her novel and the two became close friends. After Kazuhito's death, she accurately distinguishes him in his dog form due to his mannerisms and knowing where the script was hidden, although she can't listen to his thoughts she can more or less understand what he tries to say. In order to boost her confidence due to believing herself to have won awards due to his father's intervention, she challenged Natsuno to a writing contest and used several techniques, such as hypnosis and suggestion to hinder her, but was still defeated and told by Natsuno that her father made no intervention and her awards were in fact, earned by her own hard work. Following this, she winds up befriending Natsuno and even calls her "senpai".

A popular young idol and also a famous writer on the level of Natsuno. She frequently appears in the story, alongside her many servants/bodyguards, and is always trying to steal the spotlight, but is comically taken away by her men due to her busy schedule. She has a dislike for Natsuno and is hinted to have an equal dislike towards dogs.

A strange red-haired maid dressed in red who serves Himehagi Momiji with great devotion. She has a habit of dancing and singing alone on a park chants for her mistress and becomes incredibly embarrassed towards any witness, to the point she will attack the victim viciously (usually Kazuhito). In combat, she uses a hidden blade within her broom (giving it at resemblance to a Naginata) which is tough enough to compete with Natsuno's Hasajiro. Although the two clash with certain recurrence, their battles are almost always interrupted.

A rampant criminal and the man responsible for Kazuhito's death. He also becomes an avid reader of Natsuno's book after he began squatting in Kazuhito's apartment and even fights using moves inspired by her characters and even uses the thick books of the Deadly Sins series as both weapons and armor. He's confronted by Natsuno and left hanging from a bridge after a battle. However, even when Natsuno encourages Kazuhito to take revenge, he decides to spare him instead to which he is then promptly arrested.

Media

Print
Dog & Scissors began as a light novel series written by Shunsuke Sarai, with illustrations by Tetsuhiro Nabeshima. Enterbrain published 14 volumes from February 28, 2011 to January 30, 2015 under their Famitsu Bunko imprint; 10 comprise the main story, while the other four are short story collections.

A manga adaptation, illustrated by Kamon Ōniwa, was serialized in Kadokawa Shoten's Shōnen Ace between the July 2012 and May 2014 issues. Four tankōbon volumes were released between January 26, 2013 and April 26, 2014. The English version of the manga adaptation is available on BookWalker.

Anime
A 12-episode anime adaptation directed by Yukio Takahashi and produced by Gonzo it premiered on AT-X and aired between July 1 to September 16, 2013. The series had been acquired for online streaming in North America by Crunchyroll, then owned by the Chernin Group. in addition to being licensed in North America by Sentai Filmworks. After Sentai Filmworks lost the rights to the series, it was re-licensed by Funimation, which was renamed itself to Crunchyroll in 2022 after its parent Sony Pictures Television acquired the service that same year. The series uses two pieces of theme music.

Episode list

References

External links
  
 

2011 Japanese novels
2013 Japanese television series endings
Anime and manga based on light novels
Comedy anime and manga
Famitsu Bunko
Funimation
Gonzo (company)
Japanese comedy novels
Madman Entertainment anime
Kadokawa Shoten manga
Kadokawa Dwango franchises
Sentai Filmworks
Shōnen manga
Television shows based on light novels